Trujillo is a municipality located in Extremadura, an autonomous community of Spain in the Province of Cáceres. In 2013, the municipality had 9,086 inhabitants (INE Census, 2013). Originally settled on a granite knoll which was readily fortified, the town now extends to the southeast of its original site. Trujillo is both a centre for tourism, with over 25 hotels, and a regional market town.

The old town contains many medieval and renaissance buildings.

It hosts the national cheese festival in early May.

History 
Trujillo was settled on a granite batholith during Prehistoric times. In Roman times, the town was known as Turgalium and became a prefecture stipendiary of the Lusitanian capital, Emerita Augusta (today's Mérida). Later, it was colonised by East Germanic tribes (mainly Visigoths), although the prevalence of the population would still have been Hispano-Roman.

Following the Islamic conquest after 711, Trujillo became one of the main towns in the region (known as ترجالة Turjalah in Arabic). This taifa was subject to the Umayyad Emirate and the subsequent Caliphate ruled until the middle of the 11th century. During this time, the ethnic tensions between Berbers and Arabs weakened the Caliphate militarily.

Following the seizure of a large part of the territory of the former Taifa of Toledo by the Almoravids away from Alfonso VI, Trujillo became a staging ground from where Almoravid razzias were launched against the land of Talavera in the early 12th century.

During the time of Almohad rule, wars with Portugal, Castile, and León guaranteed that the possession of Trujillo was tenuous. Rule alternated between these kingdoms and the Almohads, returning for the last time to the Muslims in 1195. Between 1188 and 1195, it was the headquarters of the military order of Trujillo.

In the Spring of 1196, with help from the Kingdom of León, Almohads raided the Tagus valley and occupied Santa Cruz and Trujillo, which had been previously left forsaken by the order of Trujillo.

An army formed by forces of the military orders and the Bishop of Plasencia laid siege to Trujillo with the support of Ferdinand III. Muhammad ibn Hüd tried to relieve the town, but was driven off by the besieging army.

The town was finally captured on 25 January 1232. During the final assault, according to the local legend, the Christian forces were faltering just short of victory when many reported seeing the Virgin Mary (known as Virgen de la Victoria in Spanish, or the Virgin Mary of Victory) between the two towers, or Arco del Triunfo, in the castle. Sufficiently inspired, Christian troops pressed on and achieved victory, defeating the Muslims who were inside.

Together with Plasencia, Cáceres and Coria, Trujillo was one of the few major royal demesne towns in the region, where otherwise maestrazgo lands tended to prevail.

Alfonso X granted Trujillo a fuero in 1256.

Later, it had a Jewish quarter located outside the powerful medieval walls. Trujillo, with the growth of the population, was gradually extended beyond the walls.

Then some Trujillanos went to America to discover new places. When they come back, they built majestic palaces near the Plaza Mayor and surrounds, most of them can be visited today. Francisco Pizarro came back and helped enrich his family in the Plaza Mayor. His daughter from an Incan princess returned at 18 to marry her uncle, and lived the rest of her life in Trujillo as a lady of great estate.

After 1595, the city experienced the arrival of a number of forcibly relocated 'new moriscos' banished from Granada. From 1610 to 1611, about 130 morisco families (590 individuals) were reportedly expelled from Trujillo, although the permanence of a number of 'old moriscos', who enjoyed support from the local society, remained a cause of concern.

During the War for Independence, one of the first authorities that responded to the call of the Junta of Móstoles in May 1808 was the mayor of Trujillo, Antonio Martin Rivas, who prepared enlistments of volunteers, with food and arms, plus the mobilization of troops, to go to the aid of the Junta. Trujillo was captured by the French in 1811 and held until 1812.

In 1834, the city became the official headquarters of the Judicial District of Trujillo. In the census of 1842, it had 110 households and 6026 residents.

Geography

Climate 

Trujillo has a hot-summer Mediterranean climate, type Csa, in the modified Köppen classification.

Ecology 
As in many towns in Extremadura, Trujillo's old buildings provide homes for a breeding population of storks. Other birds of interest include the Lesser kestrel, which nests in the bull-ring and other urban sites.

Monuments 
Trujillo has a rich heritage. Among the most important monuments are the Castle (Alcazaba), the church of Santiago, the church of Santa María la Mayor, the church of San Francisco, the Church of San Martín, the Plaza Mayor, and renaissance palaces such as the palace of the Marquis of the Conquest, the palace of the Orellana-Pizarro family, the palace of the Duques de San Carlos, Marquesado de Piedras Albas, the house of the strong Altamirano, Palace Chaves (Luis Chaves Old), and of course the walled old town.

The Palacio de Piedras Albas was built circa 1530 by Don Pedro Suárez de Toledo, formerly owned by the Orellana Toledo family, the Marqueses de Orellana and later by the Marqueses de San Juan de Piedras Albas.

The city has several museums, including the Museum of Coria (Javier Salas Foundation), Pizarro's House, Enrique Elías Museum (local designer), and the Museum of Cheese and Wine.

Events

The Chiviri 

The culmination of Holy Week is celebrated on Easter Sunday (declared an event of regional interest). The town square is full of people dressed in local costumes. They sing, dance, eat and drink to the beat of Chíviri. The following day, Easter Monday, is a holiday in the city and locals have the custom of going to the countryside for picnics.

National Cheese Fair
On 1 May, the National Cheese Fair takes place, which is the most important cheese competition in Spain. The Plaza Mayor becomes a huge fair where it is possible to taste cheeses from around Spain. This festival draws a large crowd, with organizers reporting that approximately 100,000 people attend on a yearly basis.

Festivities in honour of Virgen de la Victoria 
They take place at the end of August or in early September. During the festival the Virgen de la Victoria (Our Lady of Victory) is moved from her normal place in the chapel of the Castle to the church of San Martín, in the Plaza Mayor, where the religious events are celebrated. In addition, there are puppets (The Adventures of Peneque el Valiente (Peneque the brave) with Miguel Pino), capeas and the Festival of Music, Dance and Theatre in the Castle. Also a local teenager is elected as "Queen of the festivities" and she has her own entourage.

Twin cities 
Twin cities with Trujillo are:

  Almagro, Spain.
  Batalha, Portugal.
  Castegnato, Italy.
  Santa Fe de Antioquia, Colombia.
  Piura, Peru.
  Trujillo, Peru.
  Trujillo, Honduras.

Gallery

References
 Citations

 Bibliography

External links

Tourist information
 Map
 Leisure
 Trujillo cuisine, sights and transport
 National Cheese Fair
 Elaboración y comercialización del queso cacereño—More information about the history of the National Cheese Fair (In Spanish)

Local information
 City Council
 Local TV
 Javier Catalan's news
 HOY Newspaper's news

Municipalities in the Province of Cáceres
Special Protection Areas of Extremadura